Clarkia breweri is a species of wildflower known by the common names fairy fans and Brewer's clarkia. This rare plant is endemic to California, where it is known from only seven counties in the central part of the state. It produces short stems under 20 centimeters in height and sparse, narrow leaves. The distinctive flowers have four pink to lavender petals, each about 2 centimeters long and wide, with 3 odd lobes, the middle lobe being long and spoon-shaped.

Typical habitat is shale or serpentine scree.

References

External links
Jepson Manual Profile
Photo gallery

breweri
Endemic flora of California
Natural history of the California chaparral and woodlands
Natural history of the California Coast Ranges
Natural history of Contra Costa County, California
~
Plants described in 1864
Flora without expected TNC conservation status